The first magazine in Finland, a Swedish-language women's magazine named Om Konsten at rätt behaga, was published in 1782. The number of the Finnish magazines was about 1,200 in the 1980s. In the 1990s, the circulation of magazines increased, being 5.4 million copies in 1990 and 6.2 million copies in 1999. 

The number of magazines was 2,819 in 2001. Magazines accounted for 18% of the Finnish press market in 2007. There were 3,300 magazines in 2008, half of which were trade and business magazines. Total circulation of the magazines was 13.8 million in 2008. In 2009, 29 new magazines were launched.

This is an incomplete list of magazines published in the country. These magazines are published in Finnish or in other languages.

Boat magazines

 Kippari
 Navigare
 Pro Sail Magazine
 Puuvene
 Venelehti
 Venemestari

Car magazines

 Auto Bild Suomi
 GTi-Magazine
 Mobilisti
 Moottori
 Spinneri Magazine
 Tekniikan Maailma
 Tuulilasi
 V8-Magazine

Computer magazines

 Enter
 KotiMikro (Kompuutteri kaikille)
 Mikrobitti
 MikroPC
 Pelaaja
 Pelit
 Printti
 Prosessori
 Skrolli
 Tietokone
 Tilt
 Tivi

Crime magazines 
 Alibi
 Rikosposti

Cultural magazines

 Aikalainen
 Basso
 Etsijä
 Filmihullu
Finsk Tidskrift
 Free!
 Hiidenkivi
 Image
 Kaltio
 Kerberos
 Kirjo
 Kulttuurivihkot
 Kumppani
 Liekki
 Lumooja
 Neliö
 Nuori Voima
 Parnasso
 Propaganda
 Quosego
 Rondo
 Revontulet
 SixDegrees
 Taite
 Toinen vaihtoehto
 Tuli & Savu
 Ultra
 Vartija
 Vegaia
 Z

Current events magazines, formal
 Kumppani
 Ovi Magazine
 Suomen Kuvalehti
 Viikkosanomat

Current events magazines, informal
 Apu
 Hymy
 Seura

Design and living

 Avotakka
 Glorian antiikki
 Glorian koti
 Meidän Mökki
 Meidän Talo

Economic magazines

 Arvopaperi
 Ässä
 Ekonomi
 Fakta
 Forum
 Kehittyvä liikkeenjohto
 Markkinointi & Mainonta
 Presso
 Talouselämä
 Taloustaito
 Tehostaja
 Tekniikka ja Talous

Family and home magazines

 Kaksplus
 Kodin Kuvalehti
 Kotiliesi
 Valitut Palat

Men's lifestyle magazines
 Aatami
 AKU.
 Slitz
 Urkki

Music magazines 

 Blues News
 Inferno
 Musa.fi
 POP
 Rondo
 Rumba
 Rytmi
 Soundi
 Sue
 Trad

Occultistic magazines 
 Hermeetikko
 Ultra

Paparazzi magazines
 7 päivää
 Katso!
 Oho!

Political magazines

 .kom
 Debatti
 Garm
 Kurikka
 Libero
 Murros
 Muutoksen kevät
 Paukku
 PAX
 Rauhan Puolesta
 Siniristi
 Tilanne
 Tuisku
 Ulkopolitiikka
 Uusi Nainen
 Vihreä Lanka
 Ydin

Pornographic magazines

 Erotiikan Maailma
 Haloo!
 Hustleri
 Jallu
 Kalle
 Lollo
 Napakymppi

Professional magazines

 Journalisti
 Kirjatyö
 Kuntalehti
 Lakimies
 Maankäyttö 
 Opettaja

School magazines
 Kevätpörriäinen
 Koululainen
 Oulun Koulun Kohinaa

Scientific magazines

  Avaruusluotain
 Historiallinen Aikakauskirja
 Kasvatus
 Kielikello
 Niin & näin
 Tähdet ja avaruus
 Tiede
 Tiedepolitiikka
 Tieteen Kuvalehti
 Tieteessä tapahtuu
 Virittäjä

Sport magazines

 Fillari
 Futari
 GOAL
 Juoksija
 Sport
 Urheilulehti
 Vauhdin Maailma
 Veikkaaja

Technical magazines
 Forum
 iTurku Magazine
 Tekniikan Maailma

University magazines

 Äpy
 Aviisi
 Julkku
 Kylteri
 Polyteekkari
 Tutkain
 Yliopisto
 Yliopistolainen

Women's lifestyle magazines

 Anna
 Costume
 Eeva
 Gloria
 Jade
 Kauneus ja Terveys
 Me Naiset
 Olivia
 Om Konsten att Rätt Behaga
 Regina
 SARA
 Trendi
 Tulva

Young adult magazines

 City
 Metropoli
 Papper
 V

Youth's magazines

 Demi
 Hevoshullu
 Sinä&Minä
 Suosikki
 Villivarsa

Others

 Aika
 ET-lehti
 Fyren
 Kansa Taisteli
 Koti ja Yhteiskunta
 Kunta ja me
 Me-lehti
 Oma Aika
OP
 Pirkka
 Rekyyli
 Retki
 Riista
 Rotary Norden
 Sää´mođđâz
 Sarjakuvalehti
 Softaaja
 Suomen Luonto
 Suomen Sotilas
 Tähtivaeltaja
 Trendi Veli
 Tuulispää 
Valvoja
 Yhteishyvä

See also
 List of Finnish newspapers
 Media of Finland

References

Magazines
Finland